Mark Keane (born 1981) is a hurler. His league and championship career with the Limerick senior team spanned seven seasons from 2000 until 2006.

Keane made his debut on the inter-county scene at the age of sixteen when he was selected for the Limerick minor team. He spent two championship seasons with the minor team, however, he enjoyed little success during that time. Keane subsequently joined the Limerick under-21 team, winning three successive All-Ireland medals from 2000 to 2002. By this stage he had also joined the Limerick senior team, making his debut during the 2000 league. Over the course of the next seven seasons Keane became a regular member of the starting fifteen, however, he enjoyed little success in terms of silverware. He played his last game for Limerick in July 2006.

Career statistics

Honours

South Liberties
Munster Intermediate Club Hurling Championship: 2009
Limerick Intermediate Hurling Championship: 2009

Limerick
Munster Intermediate Hurling Championship: 2008
All-Ireland Under-21 Hurling Championship: 2000, 2001, 2002
Munster Under-21 Hurling Championship: 2000, 2001, 2002

References

1981 births
Living people
South Liberties hurlers
Limerick inter-county hurlers